Erika may refer to:

Arts and Entertainment 

 Hayasaka Erika (Megatokyo)
 Erika (Friends)
 Erika (Pokémon)
 Erika (Underworld)
 Erika Itsumi (Girls und Panzer)
 Erika (film), a 1971 Italian thriller film
 "Erika" (song), a German marching song

People 
 Erika (given name), a female given name (including a list of persons and fictional characters with the name)
 Érika (born 1988), female Brazilian footballer

Science 

 Any of several tropical storms named Erika
 Erika (moth), a genus of moth

Other 

 , (ship) an oil tanker which sank off the coast of France in 1999
 ERIKA Enterprise, (software) an open source OSEK/VDX embedded operating system
 Erika (law), maritime laws, legislative packages of the European Union

See also
 Erica (disambiguation)
 

